TBA stands for  or .

TBA or Tba may also refer to:

Arts and entertainment 
 TBA Entertainment, owned by Reba McEntire
 Time-Based Art Festival, in Portland, Oregon, United States
 Turning the beat around, in electronic music
 TBA Studios, a Philippine film studio

Chemicals 
 2,4,6-Tribromoanisole, causing cork taint
Tetrabutylammonium, a cation used in laboratories
 Tert-Butyl alcohol, used as a solvent

Other uses 
 TBA* (Time-Bounded A*), a computational search algorithm
 Traditional birth attendant, an untrained midwife
 Trenes de Buenos Aires, an Argentine railway company
 Trockenbeerenauslese, a style of German or Austrian dessert wine